Ben Weber may refer to:
Ben Weber (composer) (1916–1979), American composer
Ben Weber (baseball) (born 1969), Major League Baseball right-handed relief pitcher
Ben Weber (actor) (born 1972), American film and television actor
Bernardus Weber (born 1912), Dutch sculptor

See also
Benjamin Webber (disambiguation)